Living in the Past may refer to:

 "Living in the Past" (song), a 1969 song by Jethro Tull
 Living in the Past (album), a 1972 compilation album by Jethro Tull
 Living in the Past (TV series), a 1978 UK reality programme
 "Living in the Past", a song by The Prom from Under the Same Stars
 “Living in the Past”, a song by Motörhead from their 2006 album Kiss of Death

"Living in the past", a song by Drum The Machine 12" single 198...